The Transport Board was the British Royal Navy organisation responsible for the transport of supplies and military.  It is also referred to as the Board of Transport and Transport Office.

History
It existed between 1690 and 1724, and again between 1794 and 1817 and was initially a subsidiary board of the Navy Board. In 1818 its functions were merged into the Board of Admiralty.

It originated in the need to transport the British Army to Ireland in 1689 to meet the Jacobite invasion of Ireland. The responsibility for the transportation was given to a board, later named the Commission for Transportation. In time the commission assumed responsibility for transportation to all areas, not just Ireland. In 1724 the commission was disbanded and other Admiralty boards and several departments of the War Office assumed its functions. This arrangement did not work well.

1794 to 1817

The division of responsibilities and abuses that followed led to the creation of another Transport Board in 1794, which was one of three boards — Navy, Victualling, and Transportation — that then ran the Royal Navy until 1817. The Transportation Board centralized and unified the function of military transportation overseas. The Army, therefore, had to arrange all movement by sea through the Transport Board.

The establishment in 1794 of the board reflected experience gained in the War of American Independence. A strong supporter was Sir Charles Middleton (later Lord Barham), the former Controller of the Navy.

The Transport Board assumed responsibility for the care of prisoners of war on 22 December 1799 from the Sick and Hurt Commissioners, and in 1806 the Transport Board had taken over the business of the Sick and Hurt Board.

In its Transport Service role, the board was responsible for “the hiring and appropriating of Ships and Vessels for the conveyance of Troops and Baggage, Victualling, Ordnance, Barrack, Commissariat, Naval and Military Stores of all kinds, Convicts and Stores to New South Wales and a variety of miscellaneous services such as the provision of Stores and a great variety of Articles for the Military Department in Canada and many Articles of Stores for the Cape of Good Hope and other Stations”. The board maintained resident agents at British ports and at those foreign ports that transports frequented. The board also employed agents who travelled with the transports.

The transport agents represented the first quasi-professional specialization among commissioned officers. The transport agents were uniformed Navy officers under the employ of the Transport Board, but not being sea officers, were not subject to naval discipline. Their job was to control and organize merchant ships that the government had chartered. To assist them in their duties, agents had a staff consisting of a purser, boatswain, gunner, and carpenter, all appointed by warrant and on Navy pay.

Hired vessels with a transport agent (always a Royal Navy Lieutenant but termed a Commander) aboard flew a blue ensign and a "plain blue common pendant" and could exercise authority over smaller transports that carried no Agent. In the case of a large convoys, one vessel would carry a "Principal Agent" (Commander or Captain RN) with a "Blue Broad Pendant" at the main-top-mast head. In the absence of a naval escort, the Principal Agent was in charge of the convoy.

1817 to 1862 
In 1817, the Transport Board was abolished and its duties being divided between the Navy Board, which set up its own Transport Branch, and the Victualling Board, which took over the medical commissioner as well as setting up its own Transport Service. When the Navy and Victualling Boards were abolished in 1832 transport duties were assigned to the Victualling Department. Then in 1861 a select Committee of the House of Commons that contained both Navy and Army officers, recommended unanimously the formation of a separate and distinct Transport Office under the sole control of the Lords Commissioners of the Admiralty "To carry out transport of every kind required by our government to any part of our coast and to all our colonies and possessions, including India". In 1862 the responsibility for the provision of transportation was divided and a separate Director of Transports appointed who headed a new Transport Department.

Timeline
Note: Below is a timeline of responsibility for transportation for the Royal Navy.
 Navy Board, Victualling Board (Board of Victualling Commissioners), 1683-1793
 Navy Board, Transport Board, 1794-1816
 Navy Board, Transport Branch, 1817-1832
 Board of Admiralty, Comptroller of Victualling and Transport Services, 1832-1861
 Board of Admiralty, Transport Department, 1862-1917

See also 
 Penal transportation
 Navy Board
 Board of Admiralty
 Admiralty

References

External links 
 History and Functions of The Sea Transport Services, Your Archives, The National Archives
 Transport Board, In-Letters And Orders... – ADM/MT&ET, National Maritime Museum
 "Naval Administration" CHAPTER IX, by Sir Vesey Hamilton, G.C.B. (1896)
 ABUSES IN THE NAVY AND BARRACK DEPARTMENTS, HC Deb 15 February 1810 vol 15 cc426-34

Royal Navy
1690 establishments in England
1724 disestablishments in Great Britain
1794 establishments in Great Britain
1817 disestablishments in the United Kingdom